Willibald-Pirckheimer-Medaille was a Bavarian literary prize.

Selected winners
1955: Friedrich Heer
1956: Inge Meidinger-Geise, Franz Schnabel
1958: Carl Jacob Burckhardt, Heimito von Doderer, Albrecht Goes
1960: Ilse Langner, Sigismund von Radecki, Max Rychner
1962: Jeannie Ebner
1963: Herbert Meier
1964: Max Brod
1966: Rolf Bongs

References

Literary awards of Bavaria